Sarah Hughes Brewery in Sedgley, in the Black Country of England, dates from the Victorian era. It was bought by Sarah Hughes in 1921 and brewed until 1957, before re-opening in 1987.

History 

The Beacon Hotel and brew house dates from the Victorian era being built around 1850. In 1865 the licensee was Abraham Carter and the hotel was later run by his widow, Nancy. James Fellows, a brewer, was licensee from 1910-1921, before the business was bought by Sarah Hughes. Sarah ran the brewery until her death in 1951. Subsequently, her son, Alfred operated the brewery until 1957 when brewing ceased. It was reopened in 1987 by a grandson of Sarah Hughes.

Location 

The brewery is at 129 Bilston Street, Sedgley. It is attached to the Beacon Hotel which acts as the brewery tap.

References 

Breweries in England
British companies established in 1921
Food and drink companies established in 1921
Companies based in the West Midlands (county)